Tweddell may refer to:

 Ed Tweddell (c. 1941–2005), Australian businessman
 John Tweddell (1769–1799), English classical scholar and traveller
 Ralph Hart Tweddell (1843–1895), English engineer, inventor of the portable hydraulic riveter

See also
 Tweddell remains affair, a controversy over the possessions of John Tweddell
 Tweddle (disambiguation)